Events in the year 2017 in Tonga.

Incumbents
 Monarch: Tupou VI
 Prime Minister: ʻAkilisi Pōhiva

Events

Deaths
19 February – Halaevalu Mataʻaho ʻAhomeʻe, royal (b. 1926).

References

 
Years of the 21st century in Tonga
Tonga
Tonga
2010s in Tonga